is a private junior college in the city of Ichikawa in Chiba Prefecture, Japan. Originally established as a women's junior college in 1950, the school became coeducational in 2005.

External links
 Official website 

Japanese junior colleges
Educational institutions established in 1950
Private universities and colleges in Japan
Universities and colleges in Chiba Prefecture
1950 establishments in Japan
Ichikawa, Chiba